Pavlovskaya is a rural locality (a stanitsa) and the administrative center of Pavlovsky District of Krasnodar Krai, Russia. Population: 31,133(2020),

References

Rural localities in Krasnodar Krai
Kuban Oblast